Veronika Dvořáková (born 7 December 2000) is a Czech handball player who plays for DHK Baník Most and the Czech Republic national team.

Achievements
Czech First Division:
Winner: 2018

References

2000 births
Living people
People from Cheb
Czech female handball players
Sportspeople from the Karlovy Vary Region
21st-century Czech women